Zakhopyorsky is a rural locality (a khutor) and the administrative center of Zakhopyorskoye Rural Settlement, Nekhayevsky District, Volgograd Oblast, Russia. The population was 492 as of 2010. There are 6 streets.

Geography 
Zakhopyorsky is located on the right bank of the Khopyor River, 18 km southwest of Nekhayevskaya (the district's administrative centre) by road. Atamanovsky is the nearest rural locality.

References 

Rural localities in Nekhayevsky District